Featherbed Moss is a flat-topped hill,  high, in the Peak District in the county of Derbyshire in England. It is sometimes mistakenly thought to be a joint county top.

Description 
Featherbed Moss is a treeless, domed summit covered by moist peaty moorland vegetation. It rises south of Chew Reservoir. To the south the land falls increasingly steeply into the Torside Reservoir and, to the east into the ravine of the Crowden Great Brook through which the Pennine Way runs from north to south.

References 

Mountains and hills of the Peak District
Mountains and hills of Derbyshire
Moorlands of England